Club Atlético Tiro Federal Argentino (mostly known just as Tiro Federal or Tiro Federal de Rosario) is an Argentine football club from the city of Rosario, in Santa Fe Province. The team currently fun plays in Torneo Argentino A, the third division of the Argentine football league system.

History

Founded on March 29, 1905, Tiro Federal was member of Liga Rosarina de Football, winning the "Copa Nicasio Vila" organised by the body in 1920, 1925 and 1926. As LRF member, Tiro Federal also took part of tournaments organised by the Argentine Football Association such as Copa de Honor Municipalidad de Buenos Aires, playing the final in 1915 although they lost to Racing Club.

In 1944 (13 years after the professionalization of the game in Argentina) Tiro Federal affiliated to the AFA, where the team competed in the second division, although it was later relegated to the third division after a restructure of the national leagues in 1949. In 1962 Tiro Federal withdrew its team 12 rounds before the end of the competition and was expelled from the AFA. Tiro then returned to play in the Rosario league, but then financial problems made the club leave the local league.

Businessman Carlos Dávola took over the management of the club at the end the 1990s, and started a very ambitious plan. In 1997 Tiro won the local second division, and then the first division in 1999, 2000 and 2001. At the same time it participated in Torneo Argentino B (the regionalized fourth division) in the 1998–99 season, finishing in second place and winning promotion to Torneo Argentino A.

After winning the 2003 Clausura tournament of Torneo Argentino A, Tiro Federal promoted to Primera B Nacional, the second division of Argentina. In 2004–05 Tiro Federal won the championship, promoting for the first time to the highest level, Primera División.

At the end of their first tournament in the First Division, in the 2005 season, Tiro Federal ended 19th out of 20 teams. However, one of its players, Javier Cámpora, ended as the top scorer of the tournament. On April 8, 2006, Tiro Federal was relegated to Primera B Nacional, the second division of Argentine football.

At the end of 2010–11 season, after spending four years in the second division, Tiro federal was relegated to Torneo Argentino A, the regionalized third division in Argentina by then.

Stadium
Tiro Federal's stadium is located at the Ludueña neighborhood of Rosario. Known as "El Fortín de Ludueña" (Ludueña's Fortress), the stadium doesn't comply with regulations for first division matches. It currently plays at the Club Real Arroyo Seco's stadium in the nearby city of Arroyo Seco, and for specially important matches, at Newell's Old Boys' stadium.

Current squad
As of July 30, 2015.

Titles

National

League
 Primera B Nacional (1): 2004–05
 Torneo Argentino A (1): 2002–03
 Torneo Argentino B (1): 1998–99
 Primera C (1): 1952

National cups
 Copa Dr. Carlos Ibarguren (1): 1920

Regional
 Primera División (4): 1998, 1999, 2000, 2001
 Segunda División (5): 1907, 1918, 1920, 1925, 1997
 Tercera División (4): 1908, 1918, 1919, 1929, 1930
 Torneo Preparación (1): 2004
 Copa Nicasio Vila (3): 1920, 1925, 1926 
 Copa Semanario Reflejos: 1922

References

External links
Tiro Federal on Twitter

 
Association football clubs established in 1905
Football clubs in Rosario, Santa Fe
1905 establishments in Argentina